SuperClásico is a 2011 Danish romantic comedy film set in Argentina and directed by Ole Christian Madsen. The film was selected as the Danish entry for the Best Foreign Language Film at the 84th Academy Awards. On 18 January 2012, the film was named as one of the nine shortlisted entries for the Oscars.

Plot
The Danish wine seller Christian receives the divorce papers of his wife Anna, who works in Argentina as a sports agent. Since their 16-year-old son Oscar is supposed to visit Anna, Christian decides to fly along to convince his wife not to divorce him. However, she already has a relationship with the Argentinian football star Juan Diaz, who is about to play the most important Argentinean soccer game, the Superclásico. Christian gets to know Argentine culture and people during his stay: The elderly but passionate housekeeper Fernanda, with whom he has a short affair and the odd winegrower Mendoza, who meets a fellow sufferer in Christian. 

Meanwhile, son Oscar meets the travel guide Veronica. He runs away from home and starts a relationship with her. When the relationship comes to light, there are problems that can be resolved with Christian's help. When Anna and Juan Diaz have their first arguments, Christian and Anna get closer again. Only then does Christian, changed by the Argentinean culture, begin to let go of Anna. After the marriage of Juan Diaz and Anna, Christian goes happily home to Denmark.

Cast
 Paprika Steen as Anna
 Anders W. Berthelsen as Christian
 Adriana Mascialino as Fernanda
 Sebastián Estevanez as Juan Díaz
 Dafne Schiling as Veronica
 Jamie Morton as Oscar
 Mikael Bertelsen as Narrator
 Miguel Dedovich as Mendoza

See also
 List of submissions to the 84th Academy Awards for Best Foreign Language Film
 List of Danish submissions for the Academy Award for Best Foreign Language Film

References

External links
 

2011 films
2011 comedy films
Danish romantic comedy films
2010s Danish-language films
Films shot in Buenos Aires
Films set in Argentina
Films directed by Ole Christian Madsen